Surprise is the debut album by American singer-songwriter Crystal Waters released on June 25, 1991 by Mercury Records. It includes the hit singles "Makin' Happy", "Surprise" and the top ten hit "Gypsy Woman (She's Homeless)", which peaked at number 8 on the US Billboard Hot 100, and number 2 on the UK Singles Chart.

Although the album stalled at number 197 on the US Billboard 200, it performed better in both the club/dance and urban music markets, peaking at number 65 on the Top R&B/Hip-Hop Albums chart. It also peaked at number 23 on the Top Heatseekers chart.

Track listing

Chart positions

Album

Singles

References

1991 debut albums
Crystal Waters albums
Mercury Records albums